T. intermedia may refer to:

 Terminalia intermedia (disambiguation), several species of tropical tree
 Thais intermedia, a sea snail species
 Tillandsia intermedia, a plant species
 Trialeurodes intermedia, a whitefly species
 Triplophysa intermedia, a ray-finned fish species
 Tristramella intermedia, an extinct fish species that was endemic to Israel
 Trypeta intermedia, a fruit fly species
 Typhula intermedia, a synonym for Typhula variabilis, a plant pathogen species

See also
 Intermedia (disambiguation)